Francisca Irazoqui Ríos (born 4 December 2003) is a field hockey player from Chile.

Personal life
Irazoqui has a younger sister, Antonia, who has also represented Chile in field hockey.

Career

Junior national team
Francisca Irazoqui made her debut for the Chile U–21 team at the 2021 Pan American Junior Championship in Santiago, Chile.

Las Diablas
Following her junior debut, Irazoqui was named in the Las Diablas squad for the first time the in 2022. She made her debut at the inaugural FIH Nations Cup in Valencia.

References

External links

2003 births
Living people
Chilean female field hockey players
Female field hockey midfielders